The Temple of Hercules or Temple of Heracles may refer to:

Places 
 Temple of Hercules Victor, or Temple of Hercules Olivarius, in the Forum Boarium in Rome
 Great Altar of Hercules, the cult center predating the Temple of Hercules Victor
 Temple of Hercules Victor in the Sanctuary of Hercules Victor (Tivoli)
 Temple of Hercules (Amman), the Roman temple in the citadel of Amman, Jordan, containing remnants of a monumental sculpture
 Temple of Heracles, Agrigento, in old Akragas in Agrigento, Sicily, Italy
 Temple of Hercules Custos, a lost temple to Hercules the Guardian
 Temple of Hercules Musarum, a lost temple in Rome to Hercules of the Muses
 Temple of Hercules Pompeianus, a lost temple in Rome
 Shrine of Hercules Curinus, in the comune of Sulmona, Italy
 Spartia temple, a temple of Heracles and his mother Alcemene in Sesklo, Greece